Domino Masters (stylized as DOMiNO MASTERS) is an American reality competition television series that premiered on Fox on March 9, 2022. The series is hosted by Eric Stonestreet with Danica McKellar, Vernon Davis, and Steve Price serving as judges.

Format 
Teams consisting of three domino-building competitors are tasked with building creations out of domino pieces based on a given theme. The judges will name the winning team's build, advancing them to the next round. The season will culminate in a finale, in which top teams compete for $100,000, a Domino Masters trophy, and the title of Domino Masters.

Production 
On March 26, 2021, it was announced that Fox had ordered the series with Eric Stonestreet as host. On May 16, 2021, it was announced that actress Danica McKellar, former football player Vernon Davis, and domino expert Steve Price would serve as judges for the series. On January 26, 2022, it was announced that the series would premiere on March 9, 2022.

Elimination table

Episodes

Ratings

References

External links 
 
 

2022 American television series debuts
2020s American game shows
2020s American reality television series
English-language television shows
Fox Broadcasting Company original programming
Television series by Fox Entertainment
Television shows filmed in California